Francolite is a carbonate rich variety of the mineral fluorapatite and is present in most sedimentary phosphorites. The mineral was named after its occurrence at Wheal Franco, Whitchurch, Tavistock District, Devon, England.

References

Phosphate minerals